N = 4 supersymmetric Yang–Mills (SYM) theory is a mathematical and physical model created to study particles through a simple system, similar to  string theory, with conformal symmetry. It is a simplified toy theory based on Yang–Mills theory that does not describe the real world, but is useful because it can act as a proving ground for approaches for attacking problems in more complex theories. It describes a universe containing boson fields and fermion fields which are related by four supersymmetries (this means that swapping boson, fermion and scalar fields in a certain way leaves the predictions of the theory invariant). It is one of the simplest (because it has no free parameters except for the gauge group) and one of the few finite quantum field theories in 4 dimensions. It can be thought of as the most symmetric field theory that does not involve gravity.

Meaning of N and numbers of fields 
In N supersymmetric Yang–Mills theory, N denotes the number of independent supersymmetric operations that transform the spin-1 gauge field into spin-1/2 fermionic fields. In an analogy with symmetries under rotations, N would be the number of independent rotations, N = 1 in a plane, N = 2 in 3D space, etc... That is, in a N = 4 SYM theory, the gauge boson can be "rotated" into N = 4 different supersymmetric fermion partners. In turns, each fermion can be rotated into four different bosons: one corresponds to the rotation back to the spin-1 gauge field, and the three others are spin-0 boson fields. Because in 3D space one may use different rotations to reach a same point (or here the same spin-0 boson), each spin-0 boson is superpartners of two different spin-1/2 fermions, not just one. So in total, one has only 6 spin-0 bosons, not 16. 

Therefore,  N = 4 SYM has 1 + 4 + 6 = 11 fields, namely: one vector field (the spin-1 gauge boson), four spinor fields (the spin-1/2 fermions) and six scalar fields (the spin-0 bosons). N = 4 is the maximum number of independent supersymmetries: starting from a spin-1 field and using more supersymmetries, e.g., N = 5, only rotates between the 11 fields. To have N > 4 independent supersymmetries, one needs to start from a gauge field of spin higher than 1, e.g., a spin-2 tensor field such as that of the graviton. This is the N = 8 supergravity theory. 

In quantum chromodynamics (QCD), the gauge symmetry transforms a quark of a given color into a quark of another color. Therefore, in the context of QCD, N corresponds to the number of colors and N = 4 SYM is a toy model in which there are four colors (in Nature, QCD has N = 3 colors).

Lagrangian
The Lagrangian for the theory is
 
the field strength is  
with  the gauge field
and indices i,j = 1, ..., 6 as well as a, b = 1, ..., 4, and  represents the structure constants of the particular gauge group. The  are left Weyl fermions,  are the Pauli matrices,  is the gauge covariant derivative,  are real scalars, and  represents the structure constants of the R-symmetry group SU(4), which rotates the four supersymmetries. As a consequence of the nonrenormalization theorems, this supersymmetric field theory is in fact a superconformal field theory.

Ten-dimensional Lagrangian

The above Lagrangian can be found by beginning with the simpler ten-dimensional Lagrangian

The components  of the gauge field for i = 4 to 9 become scalars upon eliminating the extra dimensions. This also gives an interpretation of the SO(6) R-symmetry as rotations in the extra compact dimensions.

By compactification on a T6, all the supercharges are preserved, giving N = 4 in the 4-dimensional theory.

A Type IIB string theory interpretation of the theory is the worldvolume theory of a stack of D3-branes.

S-duality

 

The coupling constants  and  naturally pair together in the form:

The theory has symmetries that shift  by integers. The S-duality conjecture says there is also a symmetry which sends : as well as switching the group  to its Langlands dual group.

AdS/CFT correspondence

This theory is also important in the context of the holographic principle. There is a duality between Type IIB string theory on AdS5 × S5 space (a product of 5-dimensional AdS space with a 5-dimensional sphere) and N = 4 super Yang–Mills on the 4-dimensional boundary of AdS5. However, this particular realization of the AdS/CFT correspondence is not a realistic model of gravity, since gravity in our universe is 4-dimensional. Despite this, the AdS/CFT correspondence is the most successful realization of the holographic principle, a speculative idea about quantum gravity originally proposed by Gerard 't Hooft, who was expanding on work on black hole thermodynamics, and was improved and promoted in the context of string theory by Leonard Susskind.

Integrability  
There is evidence that N = 4 supersymmetric Yang–Mills theory has an integrable structure in the planar large N limit (see below for what "planar" means in the present context). As the number of colors (also denoted N) goes to infinity, the amplitudes scale like , so that only the genus 0 (planar graph) contribution survives. Planar Feynman diagrams are graphs in which no propagator cross over another one, in contrast to non-planar Feynman graphs where one or more propagator goes over another one. A non-planar graph has a smaller number of possible gauge loops compared to a similar planar graph. Non-planar graphs are thus suppressed by factors  compared to planar ones which therefore dominate in the large N limit. Consequently, a planar Yang–Mills theory denotes a theory in the large N limit, with N usually the number of colors. Likewise, a planar limit is a limit in which scattering amplitudes are dominated by Feynman diagrams which can be given the structure of planar graphs. In the large N limit, the coupling  vanishes and a perturbative formalism is therefore well-suited for large N calculations. Therefore, planar graphs are associated to the domain where perturbative calculations converge well.

Beisert et al. give a review article demonstrating how in this situation local operators can be expressed via certain states in "spin" chains, but based on a larger Lie superalgebras rather than SU(2) for ordinary spin. These are amenable to Bethe ansatz techniques. They also construct an action of the associated Yangian on scattering amplitudes.

Nima Arkani-Hamed et al. have also researched this subject. Using twistor theory, they find a description (the amplituhedron formalism) in terms of the positive Grassmannian.

Relation to 11-dimensional M-theory
N = 4 super Yang–Mills can be derived from a simpler 10-dimensional theory, and yet supergravity and M-theory exist in 11 dimensions. The connection is that if the gauge group U(N) of SYM becomes infinite as  it becomes equivalent to an 11-dimensional theory known as matrix theory.

See also 
 6D (2,0) superconformal field theory
 Extended supersymmetry
 N=8 Supergravity
 Supersymmetric Yang–Mills
 Seiberg–Witten theory

References

Citations

Sources 

 

Supersymmetric quantum field theory
Conformal field theory